Histone deacetylase inhibitors (HDAC inhibitors, HDACi, HDIs) are chemical compounds that inhibit histone deacetylases.

HDIs have a long history of use in psychiatry and neurology as mood stabilizers and anti-epileptics. More recently they are being investigated as possible treatments for cancers, parasitic and inflammatory diseases.

Cellular biochemistry/pharmacology 
To carry out gene expression, a cell must control the coiling and uncoiling of DNA around histones.  This is accomplished with the assistance of histone acetyl transferases (HAT), which acetylate the lysine residues in core histones leading to a less compact and more transcriptionally active euchromatin, and, on the converse, the actions of histone deacetylases (HDAC), which remove the acetyl groups from the lysine residues leading to the formation of a condensed and transcriptionally silenced chromatin. Reversible modification of the terminal tails of core histones constitutes the major epigenetic mechanism for remodeling higher-order chromatin structure and controlling gene expression.  HDAC inhibitors (HDI) block this action and can result in hyperacetylation of histones, thereby affecting gene expression. The open chromatin resulting from inhibition of histone deacetylases can result in either the up-regulation or the repression of genes.

The histone deacetylase inhibitors are a new class of cytostatic agents that inhibit the proliferation of tumor cells in culture and in vivo by inducing cell cycle arrest, differentiation and/or apoptosis. Histone deacetylase inhibitors exert their anti-tumour effects via the induction of expression changes of oncogenes or tumour suppressors, through modulating the acetylation/deacetylation of histones and/or non-histone proteins such as transcription factors. Histone acetylation and deacetylation play important roles in the modulation of chromatin topology and the regulation of gene transcription. Histone deacetylase inhibition induces the accumulation of hyperacetylated nucleosome core histones in most regions of chromatin but affects the expression of only a small subset of genes, leading to transcriptional activation of some genes, but repression of an equal or larger number of other genes. Non-histone proteins such as transcription factors are also targets for acetylation with varying functional effects. Acetylation enhances the activity of some transcription factors such as the tumor suppressor p53 and the erythroid differentiation factor GATA1 but may repress transcriptional activity of others including T cell factor and the co-activator ACTR. Recent studies [...] have shown that the estrogen receptor alpha (ERalpha) can be hyperacetylated in response to histone deacetylase inhibition, suppressing ligand sensitivity and regulating transcriptional activation by histone deacetylase inhibitors. Conservation of the acetylated ER-alpha motif in other nuclear receptors suggests that acetylation may play an important regulatory role in diverse nuclear receptor signaling functions. A number of structurally diverse histone deacetylase inhibitors have shown potent antitumor efficacy with little toxicity in vivo in animal models. Several compounds are currently in early phase clinical development as potential treatments for solid and hematological cancers both as monotherapy and in combination with cytotoxics and differentiation agents."

HDAC classification 
Based on their homology of accessory domains to yeast histone deacetylases, the 18 currently known human histone deacetylases are classified into four groups (I-IV):
Class I, which includes HDAC1, -2, -3 and -8 are related to yeast RPD3 gene;
Class IIA, which includes HDAC4, -5, -7 and -9; Class IIB -6, and -10 are related to yeast Hda1 gene;
Class III, also known as the sirtuins are related to the Sir2 gene and include SIRT1-7
Class IV, which contains only HDAC11 has features of both Class I and II.

HDI classification 
The "classical" HDIs act exclusively on Class I, II and Class IV HDACs by binding to the zinc-containing catalytic domain of the HDACs.  These classical HDIs can be classified into several groupings named according to the chemical moiety that binds to the zinc ion (except cyclic tetrapeptides which bind to the zinc ion with a thiol group). Some examples in decreasing order of the typical zinc binding affinity:
 hydroxamic acids (or hydroxamates), such as trichostatin A,
 cyclic tetrapeptides (such as trapoxin B), and the depsipeptides,
 benzamides,
 electrophilic ketones, and
 the aliphatic acid compounds such as phenylbutyrate and valproic acid.

"Second-generation" HDIs include the hydroxamic acids vorinostat (SAHA), belinostat (PXD101), LAQ824, and panobinostat (LBH589); and the benzamides : entinostat (MS-275), tacedinaline (CI994), and mocetinostat (MGCD0103).

The sirtuin Class III HDACs are dependent on NAD+ and are, therefore, inhibited by nicotinamide, as well as derivatives of NAD, dihydrocoumarin, naphthopyranone, and 2-hydroxynaphthaldehydes.

Additional functions 
HDIs should not be considered to act solely as enzyme inhibitors of HDACs.  A large variety of nonhistone transcription factors and transcriptional co-regulators are known to be modified by acetylation.  HDIs can alter the degree of acetylation nonhistone effector molecules and, therefore, increase or repress the transcription of genes by this mechanism.  Examples include: ACTR, cMyb, E2F1, EKLF, FEN 1, GATA, HNF-4, HSP90, Ku70, MKP-1, NF-κB, PCNA, p53, RB, Runx, SF1 Sp3, STAT, TFIIE, TCF, YY1, etc.

Uses

Psychiatry and neurology 
HDIs have a long history of use in psychiatry and neurology as mood stabilizers and anti-epileptics.  The prime example of this is valproic acid, marketed as a drug under the trade names Depakene, Depakote, and Divalproex.  In more recent times, HDIs are being studied as a mitigator for neurodegenerative diseases such as Alzheimer's disease and Huntington's disease.
Enhancement of memory formation is increased in mice given vorinostat, or by genetic knockout of the HDAC2 gene in mice.
While that may have relevance to Alzheimer's disease, it was shown that some cognitive deficits were restored in actual transgenic mice that have a model of Alzheimer's disease (3xTg-AD) by orally administered nicotinamide, a competitive HDI of Class III sirtuins.

Pre Clinical Research – HDI therapy for the treatment of depression 
Recent research into the causes of depression has highlighted some possible gene-environment interactions that could explain why after much research, no specific genes or loci which would indicate risk for depression have emerged. Recent studies estimate that even after successive treatments with multiple antidepressants, almost 35% of patients did not achieve remission, suggesting that there could be an epigenetic component to depression that is not being addressed by current pharmacological treatments. Environmental stressors, namely traumatic stress in childhood such as maternal deprivation and early childhood abuse have been studied for their connection to a high risk of depression in adulthood. In animal models, these types of trauma have been shown to have significant effects on histone acetylation, particularly at gene loci which have known connection to behavior and mood regulation. Current research has focused on the use of HDI therapy for depression after studies on depressed patients in the middle of a depressive episode found increased expression of HDAC2 and HDAC5 mRNA compared to controls and patients in remission.

Effects on gene expression 
Various HDAC inhibitors (HDI) have been studied for their connection to the regulation of mood and behavior, each having different, specific effects on the regulation of various genes. The most commonly studied genes include Brain-derived neurotrophic factor (BDNF) and Glial cell line-derived neurotrophic factor (GDNF) both of which help regulate neuron growth and health, whose down regulation can be a symptom of depression. Multiple studies have shown that treatment with an HDI helps to up regulate expression of BDNF: valproic acid (commonly used to treat epilepsy and bipolar disorder) as well as sodium butyrate both increased expression of BDNF in animal models of depression. One study which traced GDNF levels in the ventral striatum found increased gene expression upon treatment with SAHA.

Effects on depressive behaviors 
Pre-clinical research on the use of HDAC inhibitors (HDI) for the treatment of depression use rodents to model human depression. The tail suspension test (TST) and the forced swimming test (FST) measure the level of defeat in rodents— usually after treatment with chronic stress— which mirrors symptoms of human depression. Alongside tests for levels of HDAC mRNA, acetylation and gene expression these behavioral tests are compared to controls to determine whether or not treatment with an HDI has been successful in ameliorating symptoms of depression. Studies which used SAHA or MS-275 as their treatment compound found treated animals displayed gene expression profiles similar to those treated with fluoxetine, and displayed similar anti-depressant like behavior. Sodium butyrate is commonly used as a candidate for mood disorder treatment: studies using it both alone and in co-treatment with fluoxetine report subjects with increased performance on both TST and FST in addition to increased expression of BDNF.

Cancer treatment 
Pan-HDAC inhibitors have shown anticancer potential in several in in vitro and in vivo studies, focused on Pancreatic, Esophageal squamous cell carcinoma (ESCC), Multiple myeloma, Prostate carcinoma, Gastric cancer, Leukemia, breast, Liver cancer, ovarian cancer, non-Hodgkin lymphoma and Neuroblastoma. Because of the massive effect of pan-HDAC inhibition, witnessed by the very low dosage concentration used and by the countless biological functions affected, many scientists have focused their attention on combining the less specific HDACi treatment with other more specific anti-cancer drugs, such as the efficacy of the combination treatment with the pan-HDAC inhibitor LBH589 (panobinostat) and the BET bromodomain JQ1 compound.

Inflammatory diseases 
Trichostatin A (TSA) and others are being investigated as anti-inflammatory agents.

HIV/AIDS 
After the successful initial round of in vitro research in January 2013, the Danish Research Council awarded the research team led by Dr. Ole Søgaard from the Danish Aarhus University Hospital the amount of $2 million to proceed with clinical trials on 15 humans. The goal is for HDAC inhibitors to flush HIV from the reservoirs it builds within the DNA of infected cells, followed by a vaccination to help the immune system to neutralize any replicating virus.

One study noted the use of panobinostat, entinostat, romidepsin, and vorinostat specifically for the purpose of reactivating latent HIV in order to diminish the reservoirs. Vorinostat was noted as the least potent of the HDAC inhibitors in this trial. Another study found that romidepsin led to a higher and more sustained level of cell-associated HIV RNA reactivation than vorinostat in latently infected T-cells in vitro and ex vivo.

Other diseases 
Givinostat (ITF2357) is also under investigation for treatment of polycythemia vera (PV), essential thrombocythemia (ET) and myelofibrosis (MF).

HDIs are also being studied as protection of heart muscle in acute myocardial infarction.

References

External links 
 
 HDAC inhibitors base information about molecules that block HDACs.
 

 
Antineoplastic drugs
Mood stabilizers